Frank Lusk Babbott (August 14, 1854 – December 7, 1933) was an American  jute merchant, art collector, patron, and philanthropist.

Early life
Babbott was born in Waterville, New York on August 14, 1854, the son of Miller Babbott and Mary Elizabeth Crandall.

He was a childhood friend of George Eastman, founder of Eastman Kodak.

Education
He was educated at Amherst College, graduating in the class of 1878. He then studied at Columbia University, graduating with an LLB in 1880.

Career
Babbott was Director of Chelsea Jute Mills from 1883 to 1901.

Babbott was a member of the Brooklyn Board of Education, and president of the Brooklyn Free Kindergarten Society.

He was a trustee of various organisations:
 Packer Collegiate Institute, Brooklyn, president Board of Trustees, 1911–1933
 Vassar College (1915–1922)
 YWCA of Brooklyn
 Brooklyn Academy of Music
 Brooklyn Public Library
 Brooklyn Institute of Arts and Sciences, now Brooklyn Museum

He was vice-president of the New York Board of Education, 1902–1904.

Babbott died on December 7, 1933 at his home at 149 Lincoln Place, Brooklyn.

Literary career
Babbott edited "Classic English Odes", and "John Donne's Poems".

Personal life
Babbott's family home was 153 Lincoln Place, Brooklyn, New York. They also owned an estate at Glen Cove, Long Island, advertised for sale in 2008 at $4.2 million.

Babbott married Lydia Richardson Pratt (1857–1904), daughter of Standard Oil magnate Charles Pratt on February 18, 1886.

They had four children:
 Mary Babbott, who married Dr William Sargeant Ladd
 Frank Lusk Babbott Jr (1891–1970) (Amherst 1913)
 Lydia Pratt Babbott, who married a Dr. Emlen Stokes
 Helen L Babbott, who married Mr. Ian McDonald

Honours
Chevalier of the Legion of Honour
Commanders of the Order of the Dannebrog

Legacy
A public park (Babbott Field) and a street (Babbott Avenue), both in Waterville, New York, were named in his honor. The Babbott Room in the Octagon at Amherst College was named in memory of him.

He left a bequest of over $540,000 to Vassar College to establish the Lydia Richardson Babbott Endowment.

The Frank L. Babbott Chair of Literature & The Arts at Packer Collegiate Institute is named in his honour, established by his family in 1977.

References

External links
 Amherst College record

1854 births
1933 deaths
American merchants
American manufacturing businesspeople
Philanthropists from New York (state)
Amherst College alumni
Columbia Law School alumni
People from Waterville, New York
Charles Pratt family
Chevaliers of the Légion d'honneur
Commanders of the Order of the Dannebrog
People from Park Slope